Commonwealth Fusion Systems (CFS) is an American company founded in 2018 aiming to build a compact fusion power plant based on the ARC tokamak power plant concept. The company is based in Cambridge, Massachusetts, and is a spin-off of the Massachusetts Institute of Technology (MIT). CFS has participated in the United States Department of Energy’s INFUSE public-private knowledge innovation scheme, with several national labs and universities.

History 
CFS was founded in 2018 as a spin-off from the MIT Plasma Science and Fusion Center. After initial funding of $50 million in 2018 from the Italian multinational Eni, CFS closed its series A round of venture capital funding in 2019 with a total of US$ 115 million in funding from Eni, Bill Gates's Breakthrough Energy Ventures, Vinod Khosla's Khosla Ventures, and others. CFS raised an additional US$ 84 million in series A2 funding from Singapore's Temasek, Norway's Equinor, and Devonshire Investors, as well as from previous investors. As of October 2020, CFS had approximately 100 employees.

In September 2020, the company reported significant progress in the physics and engineering design of the SPARC tokamak, and in October 2020, the development of a new high temperature superconducting cable, called VIPER.  Over the 9-month period from 2019 to 2020, the company purchased over 186 miles of the wire in 400-600 meter lengths from vendors, more than was produced by some vendors over the preceding 6 years.

In March 2021, CFS announced plans to build a headquarters, manufacturing, and research campus (including the SPARC tokamak), in Devens, Massachusetts. Also in 2021, CEO Bob Mumgaard was appointed to the board of directors of the Fusion Industry Association, which was incorporated as a non profit association with a focus on combating climate change.

In September 2021, the company announced the demonstration of a high temperature superconducting magnet, able to generate magnetic fields of 20 Tesla. According to the New York Times, this was a successful test of "...the world's most powerful version of the type of magnet crucial to many fusion efforts..."

In November 2021, the company raised an additional $1.8 billion in Series B funding to construct and operate the SPARC tokamak, funded by Temasek, Google, Bill Gates and Eni.

In December the company began construction on SPARC in Devens, Massachusetts.

In March 2022, Axios reported that as a result of sanctions against Russia, CFS faced significant supply chain problems.

By late 2022, CFS had grown to approximately 350 employees and was preparing to move into its Devens campus.

A ceremonial opening for the Devens campus was held in February 2023.

In March 2023, Eni and Cfs signed a multi-year agreement to collaborate in obtaining the components and authorizations necessary for the construction of the first SPARC experimental plant, as well as the construction of the first Arc power plant and the identification of countries that may be interested in hosting it.

Technology 

CFS plans to focus on incorporating a large-bore, high-field (20 Tesla), yttrium barium copper oxide high-temperature superconducting magnet into a tokamak. The magnet consists of 16 layers, each containing HTS winding. The D-shaped magnet weighed 10 tons and stood 8 feet tall, including 165 miles of tape. SPARC will include 18 similar magnets.

CFS magnets use high temperature superconducting tape from a group of global suppliers.

SPARC is intended to demonstrate net-positive energy in a tokamak, paving the way for a multi-hundred MW electric ARC plant. As of September 2021, SPARC was targeted for completion by 2025. CFS also plans to build a power plant based on the ARC design at the beginning of the 2030s. Both SPARC and ARC plan to use deuterium-tritium fuel.

The company's VIPER cable can sustain higher electric currents and magnetic fields than previously possible.

The magnet technology used in SPARC is intended to give "the world a clear path to fusion power," according to the CFS CEO Bob Mumgaard.

CFS uses newly commercially available high-temperature superconductors to construct the magnets that will allow much stronger magnetic fields in a tokamak. These high-temperature superconductor magnets will allow a high field approach that will lead to CFS reaching net energy from fusion with a device that is much smaller, cheaper, and can be done much quicker.

Tokamaks work as donut-shaped devices that use magnets to manipulate and insulate the plasma where fusion occurs. SPARC is predicted to have a burning plasma, which would be the first time on earth. This would mean that the fusion process would be predominantly self-heating. On December 5, 2022, a team at LLNL's National Ignition Facility (NIF) conducted the first controlled fusion experiment in history to reach net energy, meaning it produced more energy from fusion than the laser energy used to drive it. Previous tokamaks used copper or low-temperature superconducting magnets that need to be large in size to create the magnetic field that is necessary to achieve net energy. The CFS high-temperature superconductor magnet is intended to create much stronger magnetic fields, allowing the tokamaks to be much smaller.

See also

 General Fusion
 List of fusion experiments
 Tokamak Energy

References

External links 
 

Energy companies of the United States
Nuclear technology companies of the United States
Companies based in Cambridge, Massachusetts
Nuclear fusion